Plank may refer to:
Plank (wood), flat, elongated, and rectangular timber with parallel faces
Plank (exercise), an isometric exercise for the abdominal muscles
Martins Creek (Kentucky), the location of Plank post office
The Plank (1967 film), a British comedy film with no dialogue
The Plank (1979 film), a remake of the 1967 film
Plank, a character in Ed, Edd n Eddy
Plank (party platform), an item of a political party program

People
Alex Plank (born 1986), American autism advocate
Conny Plank (1940−1987), German record producer and musician
Doug Plank (born 1953), American football player
Ed Plank (born 1952), American baseball pitcher in the late 1970s
Eddie Plank (1875−1926), early 20th-century American baseball player
Elizabeth Plank (born 1987), Canadian blogger and online journalist
Ewart G. Plank (1897−1982), American general
Heinz Plank (born 1945), German painter, draughtsman and graphic artist

Kevin Plank (born 1972), American businessman; founder of sports clothing company Under Armour
Peter "Plank" Clements, guitar technician for Radiohead
Raymond Plank (1922−2018), American businessman

See also
Walking the plank, form of execution associated with pirates
Plank house, homes of indigenous people of the Pacific Northwest constructed from the cedar tree
American historic carpentry discussed several types of plank houses
Tychonoff plank, a topological space that is used in mathematics as a counterexample to several plausible-sounding conjectures
Planck (disambiguation)
Planking (disambiguation)
Slats (disambiguation)
Walk the Plank (disambiguation)